Aliaksandra Tarasava (born June 23, 1988) is a Belarusian basketball player for TSV 1880 Wasserburg and the Belarusian national team, where she participated at the 2014 FIBA World Championship.

References

External links
 

1988 births
Living people
Belarusian women's basketball players
Sportspeople from Grodno
Point guards
Basketball players at the 2016 Summer Olympics
Olympic basketball players of Belarus
Belarusian expatriate basketball people in Slovakia
Belarusian expatriate basketball people in Germany
Belarusian expatriate basketball people in the Czech Republic
Belarusian expatriate basketball people in Turkey